Hillsborough is a civil parish in County Down, Northern Ireland. It is situated in the historic barony of Iveagh Lower, Upper Half. It is also a townland of 642 acres.

Settlements
The civil parish contains the following settlements:
Hillsborough

Townlands
Hillsborough civil parish contains the following townlands:

Aghandunvarran
Ballyhomra
Ballykeel Artifinny
Ballykeel Edenagonnell
Ballyworfy
Cabragh
Clogher
Corcreeny
Drumatihugh
Edenticullo
Hillsborough
Large Park
Lisadian
Magheradartin
Reillys Trench
Small Park
Taughblane
Tullynore

See also
List of civil parishes of County Down

References